De Aetatibus Mundi Imagines is a literary and pictorial sketchbook.  The author and illustrator of the manuscript was Francisco de Holanda (1517–84).

Description 
It is a manuscript of 189 pages.  There are brush, pen, pencil black, brown and brown ink, gouache and gold colors, on beige laid paper.

Analysis
Francisco de Holanda stayed in Rome, with the Portuguese ambassador, from 1538 until 1540. He was a friend of Michelangelo. There were 3 codices, and the third survives.

References

External links

1545 in art
16th-century illuminated manuscripts
Renaissance paintings